The Philippine National Book Awards, or simply the National Book Awards, is a Philippine literary award sponsored by the National Book Development Board (NBDB) and the Manila Critics' Circle (MCC). It is the national book award of the Philippines. From 1982 to 2008, the yearly awards were granted by the Manila Critics' Circle. In 2008, the administration of the award was transferred to the NBDB. The award is also distinguished as a major and secular Philippine literary award that is not a manuscript contest. The award categories include:

Literary Division
Best Novel in a Philippine Language (Juan C. Laya Award)
Best Novel in a Foreign Language (Juan C. Laya Award)
Best in Literary Criticism / Literary History
Best in Nonfiction Prose
Best in Graphic Literature
Best in Poetry

Non-Literary Division
Best in the Professions Category
Best in the Social Sciences Category
Best in the Art Category
Best in the Design Category

References

External links
Philippine National Book Awards official website
List of award winning books

Philippine literary awards
Fiction awards
Non-fiction literary awards
Poetry awards
Awards established in 1981